"Ahora" (English: Now) is a song recorded by Colombian reggaeton singer J Balvin for his studio album, Vibras (2018). It was written and produced by Marco "Tainy" Masis and Alejandro "Sky" Ramirez with an additional writing done by Balvin and Jesús Manuel Nieves Cortes.

Charts

Certifications

References 

2018 songs
2018 singles
J Balvin songs
Songs written by Tainy
Songs written by J Balvin
Song recordings produced by Tainy